Piz Uffiern is a mountain of the Lepontine Alps, located between the valleys of Curnera and Nalps, in the canton of Graubünden. It lies north of Piz Blas, where runs the border with the canton of Ticino.

References

External links
Piz Uffiern on Hikr

Mountains of the Alps
Alpine three-thousanders
Mountains of Graubünden
Lepontine Alps
Mountains of Switzerland